The Stone Speakers is a 2018 Canadian documentary, directed by Igor Drljaca. The film examines the growth of ideological tourism in post-war Bosnia and Herzegovina.

It premiered in the Wavelengths section of the 2018 Toronto International Film Festival, had its international premiere at the 69th Berlin International Film Festival, and was acquired for Canadian distribution by Game Theory Films. NOW Magazine's Kevin Ritchie called it "a timely film given recent debates around public monuments and who we decide to memorialize and why."

References

External links 
 
 
 

Canadian documentary films
Bosnian-language films
Films directed by Igor Drljaca
2010s Canadian films